Alejandro Navarro Brain (born 20 November 1958) is a Chilean politician who has served as a member of Parliament for the Bío-Bío Region since 1994. First as Deputy and since 2006 as Senator, in 2009 founded the Broad Social Movement (MAS in Spanish), same year that he ran for the President of the Republic post. His partner is Ana Garcia Sciaraffia and has five children. He later left MAS to form País.

Early life and education
Alejandro is the eldest son of Fernando Navarro, a carpenter and Lidia Brain, a housewife.
From an early age ANB learnt his father’s profession, helping him with minor tasks at the house’s  workshop. He also learnt how to make kites, which he would sell with his mother at the street markets. 
Navarro was educated first at the Recoleta Rafael Sanhueza Lizardi Primary School  and then at the José Miguel Carrera Secondary School.

Before Parliament
In 1982 he was accepted by the University of Concepcion, to study pedagogy in philosophy. Is during these years when Alejandro shapes his character as a determined and courageous leader, becoming the president of the University’s students federation (FEC in Spanish). This was the first association that was born after the coup d’etat in 1973. 
Alejandro joined the Socialist Party in 1983, becoming a member of the Socialist Youth Central Comité. Years later he would become director of the region’s Nacional Institute of the Youth (INJUV in Spanish). 
In 1988 he met Ana Garcia, beginning a long relationship that lasts until now. Their first child, Araxza was born in 1997. Alejandro’s other children are America, Alonso, Antonio and Amaro.

Parliamentary candidacy
In 1994 ANB was elected as a BioBio Region 45th District’s Deputy. He would then rise to prominence, serving as the citizen’s voice in Chile’s Lower Chamber while investigating large firms accused of fraud.
He would also have a keen interest in the environment, leading “green” committees and commissions that would pass several bills on this subject. 
At the same time he created his webpage, www.navarro.cl, which would become the first website of a Chilean representative.
First in 1997 and later in 2001, ANB was re-elected at the same post. At this latest election he would get 47% of the votes and become the most voted deputy in the BioBio Region and the third in the whole country.

Senator, MAS and presidential bid
In December 2005, Navarro was elected as Senator for the same region. At this election he got more than 200.000 votes, which strengthened his position as a political figure, becoming the second most voted representative in Chile.
In 2008 and after 26 years he left the Socialist Party, due to strong differences with the party leaders. A year later and together with prominent social, political and union leaders ANB founded the Broad Social Movement (MAS in Spanish), first left wing party registered before the SERVEL since Salvador Allende’s Government. Months later the same body proclaimed him as candidate for the Chilean Presidency. However, after a few weeks he decided to continue with his parliamentary work and gave his support to another prospect.
In 2013 he was once again elected as representative for the BioBio Region for the 2014-2022 period. He plans to run for President in the 2017 election for País.

Landmarks
During his constitutional career he has proposed more than 300 bills and intervened at the plenary more than 1.600 times. Thanks to this work he has been able to create more than 15 laws, making changes to the Chilean Constitution such as banning fireworks, allowing working mothers to breastfeed their children or punishing human trafficking.

References

Members of the Senate of Chile
Living people
1958 births
University of Concepción alumni
Chilean people of Spanish descent
Progressive Party (Chile) politicians
Senators of the LV Legislative Period of the National Congress of Chile